Cuando hay pasión (English title: When there is passion) is a Venezuela]n telenovela written by Benilde Ávila and produced by Venevisión in 1999. The series is based on the radionovela Valentina by Inés Rodena. This telenovela lasted 145 episodes and was distributed internationally by Venevisión International.

Fedra López and Jorge Reyes starred as the main protagonists.

Synopsis

Two love stories that unfold against the backdrop of a bitter feud between two prominent families: The Nunezes and the Malaves. Co-owners of a successful record company, they have been partners for many years. After the death of Don Carlos Nunez and his wife in an automobile accident, their eldest son, Reinaldo, took over the family's business affairs. Since then, he has spoiled his three siblings-Luis Guillermo, Gabriela and Jean Paul-as well as his two daughters, Vicky and Jennifer, by giving them all the luxuries money can buy. But now they must face a terrible truth: while Reinaldo was away undergoing a medical check-up that revealed he is terminally ill, Armando Malave cheated the Nuсez family out of all their stock in the company. This fraud, added to their extravagant expenses, has left them penniless. To make matters worse, Malave's daughter, Daniela, abandons Luis Guillermo on their wedding night, after finding out that the Nuсez fortune is gone. Coerced by her father and her evil aunt Bertha, she never shows up for the ceremony, causing Luis Guillermo to become deeply depressed.

Faced with financial ruin and humiliation at the hands of the scheming Malaves, Reinaldo tries to figure out a way to keep his family from losing what little they have left. His only confidante is Ines Leal, a kind and loving young woman who grew up in the Nunez mansion and is now his daughter's tutor and nanny. Ines has been secretly in love with Luis Guillermo as long as she can remember, but he has never even noticed. Reinaldo, a widower, not knowing that Ines’ true love is his brother, asks her to marry him so that she will be legally in charge of the family when he dies. Convinced that winning Luis Guillermo's love is impossible, and out of loyalty to Reinaldo, Ines accepts.

Also living at the Nuсez home is Diego Andres Anzola, their cousin. This brilliant young psychiatrist is engaged to Michelle, Armando Malave's youngest daughter-but he will find the love of his life in Marisela, a poor orphan whom he meets by chance, and who is taken in by the good-hearted Reinaldo when he learns that she is completely alone in the world. Surprisingly, it turns out that Marisela is the lost daughter of Flavia and Armando Malave - the daughter that Flavia has been mourning for the past 17 years. But many hardships will fall on Marisela before she can enjoy the social position she rightfully deserves...and before she and Diego Andres can find happiness together. After news of Reinaldo's death during surgery in the U.S., Ines is left with the difficult task of running the household and courageously facing the family's bitter resentment, including that of Luis Guillermo. However, Luis Guillermo eventually realizes that he has loved Ines all along; and just as she beings to see her lifelong dream come true, they receive a shocking surprise: Reinaldo's death was faked. He has been hiding all this time, planning his revenge on the family that brought shame and ruin to the Nuсez name: the Malaves. From that moment on, Diego Andres and Marisela, Ines and Luis Guillermo, will be caught in a whirlwind of intrigue, jealousy, ambition and dark secrets from the past - and will become key players in a series of unexpected events that will finally bring their stories to a riveting conclusion.

Cast

Main Cast
Fedra López as Inés de Jesús Leal
Jorge Reyes as Luis Guillermo Núñez Anzola
Jaime Araque as Diego Andrés Anzola Miralle
Ana Karina Casanova as Marisela Malavé Istúriz
Carlos Olivier as Reinaldo Núñez Anzola / Piere Diboa
Tatiana Capote as Flavia Istúriz de Malavé
Raul Amundaray as Félix Manuel Escobar
Miriam Ochoa as Bertha Betancourt
Julio Pereira as Robert Armando Malavé
Gabriel Fernandez as Padre Darío Ignacio
Niurka Acevedo as Daniela Malavé Betancourt
Julio Alcazar as Armando Malavé

Supporting Cast

Eva Blanco as Assunta
Isabel Moreno as Emperatriz Malave
Cristina Obin as Chepina
Marisela Buitriago as Solbela
Judith Vasquez as Sonia
Adelaida Mora as Martica
Carmen Francia as Brigida
Virginia Garcia as Diana Mendoza
Jose Vieira as Aldo
Mario Brito as Campusano
Mauricio Renteria as Walter Bracamont
Alexis Escamez as Asdrubal
Lisbeth Manrique as Doris Yepez
Deyalit Lopez as Carolina
Jeanette Flores as Yelitza Josefina Urbina
Jeinar Moreno as Gabriela Nuñez Anzola
Kassandra Tepper as Victoria Nuñez Anzola
Asdrubal Blanco as Jean Paul Nuñez Anzola
Wilmer Machado as Jose Isabel - Cheyito
Victor Hernandez as Alfredo Jose Hernandez
Patricia Noguera 
Anabell Rivero as Michelle Adriana Malave Betancourt
Roberto Messutti as Juan Carlos
Carmen Dominguez as Xiva
Ivette Dominguez as Peggy
Sofia Diaz as Jennifer Nuñez Anzola
Jefferson Quiñones as Arturo
Ana Zambrano as Fefa
Roxana Diaz as Betania Malave
Sonia Villamizar as Patricia Miraval
Jose Torres as Braulio Parades
Pedro Lander as Julio Cesar Estrada
Mirtha Borges as Rosaria Boromeo
Ana Massimo as Cinthia

References

External links
Cuando Hay Pasion at the Internet Movie Database

1999 telenovelas
Venevisión telenovelas
Venezuelan telenovelas
1999 Venezuelan television series debuts
1999 Venezuelan television series endings
Spanish-language telenovelas
Television shows set in Caracas